Lucía Vaamonde (born 13 December 1949) is a Venezuelan hurdler. She competed in the women's 100 metres hurdles at the 1976 Summer Olympics.

References

External links
 

1949 births
Living people
Athletes (track and field) at the 1971 Pan American Games
Athletes (track and field) at the 1972 Summer Olympics
Athletes (track and field) at the 1976 Summer Olympics
Venezuelan female hurdlers
Venezuelan pentathletes
Olympic athletes of Venezuela
Place of birth missing (living people)
Pan American Games competitors for Venezuela
20th-century Venezuelan women
21st-century Venezuelan women